See the Rise is an American Christian hardcore and Christian rock band, and they primarily play hardcore punk, post-hardcore and alternative rock. They come from Minneapolis, Minnesota. The band started making music in 2011, and their lead vocalist is Josh Meyers. They have released one studio album, Exposures, in 2015, with Voluminous Records. The band announced their final show for December 3, 2016.

Background
See the Rise is a Christian hardcore and Christian rock band from Minneapolis, Minnesota, where they formed in 2011, with their current line-up being vocalist, Josh Meyers, background vocalist and guitarist, Brian Elliott, guitarist, Jason Law, bassist, Andrew Davis, and drummer, Kyle Zahorski.

Music history
The band commenced as a musical entity in 2011, with their first studio album, Exposures, that was released on June 30, 2015, from Voluminous Records.

Members
Current members
 Josh Meyers – vocals (2011-present)
 Brian Elliott – guitar, background vocals
 Jason Law – guitar
 Andrew Davis – bass
 Kyle Zahorski – drums

Discography
Studio albums
 Exposures (June 30, 2015, Voluminous Records)

EPs
 The Theft (2013)

References

External links
Official website

Musical groups from Minnesota
2011 establishments in Minnesota
Musical groups established in 2011